The 2017 Hazfi Cup Final was the 30th final since 1975. Both teams were in poor form in the domestic league, the Hazfi cup final was the door to the AFC Champions League group-stage. If Tractor Sazi won, it meant that Naft Tehran would go to the AFC Champions League play-offs, and it would be the opposite if Naft Tehran won. Both sides were coached by one of the best Iranian coaches; Ali Daei and Amir Ghalenoei. The game was fairly dominated by Tractor Sazi but they missed most of their chances and a 27th-minute penalty miss certainly brought hope to Naft Tehran players. Naft Tehran proved the football match is 90 minutes and battled until the last chance, Sajjad Shahbazzadeh's 88th-minute goal made Naft Tehran clinch the title.

Format
The tie was contested over one leg, just like the last edition. If the teams could still not be separated, then extra time would have been played with a penalty shootout (taking place if the teams were still level after that).

Pre-match

Match history
This was Tractor Sazi's fourth Hazfi final and Naft Tehran's second appearance in the final match of the tournament. Tractor Sazi lastly won the cup in 2013–14, and became runners-up 2 times in 1976 and 1995. Naft Tehran appeared in the final in 2015 and lost to Zob Ahan, Naft Tehran is looking for its first Hazfi Cup title.

Detalis

Reference 

2017 in Iranian sport
Tractor S.C. matches
2017